Thalassoma virens is a species of ray-finned fish, a wrasse from the family Labridae, which is endemic to the reefs in waters around the Revillagigedo Islands and Clipperton Island (though during El Niño years, it has been recorded from Baja California).  This species can reach  in total length.

References

virens
Fish described in 1890